The Tabular Islamic calendar is a rule-based variation of the Islamic calendar. It has the same numbering of years and months, but the months are determined by arithmetical rules rather than by observation or astronomical calculations. It was developed by early Muslim astronomers of the second hijra century (the 8th century of the Common Era) to provide a predictable time base for calculating the positions of the moon, sun, and planets. It is now used by historians to convert an Islamic date into a Western calendar when no other information (like the day of the week) is available. Its calendar era is the Hijri year. An example is the Fatimid or Misri calendar.

It is used by some Muslims in everyday life, particularly in Ismaili and Shi'a communities, believing that this calendar was developed by Ali. It is believed that when Ali drew up this calendar, the previous events of the earlier prophets also fell into line with this calendar. It is their belief that all Fatimid Imams and their Da'is have followed this tradition.

Each year has 12 months. The odd numbered months have 30 days and the even numbered months have 29 days, except in a leap year when the 12th and final month Dhu al-Hijjah has 30 days.

Intercalary schemes

30-year cycle 
In its most common form there are 11 leap years in a 30-year cycle. Noting that the average year has 354 11/30 days and a common year has 354 days, at the end of the first year of the 30-year cycle the remainder is 11/30 day. Whenever the remainder exceeds a half day (15/30 day), then a leap day is added to that year, reducing the remainder by one day. Thus at the end of the second year the remainder would be 22/30 day which is reduced to −8/30 day by a leap day. Using this rule the leap years are year number 2, 5, 7, 10, 13, 16, 18, 21, 24, 26 and 29 of the 30-year cycle.

If leap days are added whenever the remainder equals or exceeds a half day, then all leap years are the same except 15 replaces 16 as the sixth long year per cycle.

The Ismaili Tayyebi community delays three leap days by one year: the third to year 8, the seventh to year 19 and the tenth to year 27 in their 30-year cycle.
There is another version where, in addition, the fourth leap day is postponed to year 11 and the last leap day is in the last year of the 30-year cycle.

The mean month is 29 191/360 days = 29.5305555... days, or 29d 12h 44m. This is slightly too short and so will be a day out in about 2,500 solar years or 2,570 lunar years. The Tabular Islamic calendar also deviates from the observation based calendar in the short term for various reasons.

Microsoft's Kuwaiti algorithm is used in Windows to convert between Gregorian calendar dates and Islamic calendar dates. There is no fixed correspondence defined in advance between the algorithmic Gregorian solar calendar and the Islamic lunar calendar determined by actual observation.  As an attempt to make conversions between the calendars somewhat predictable, Microsoft claims to have created this algorithm based on statistical analysis of historical data from Kuwait. According to Rob van Gent, the so-called "Kuwaiti algorithm" is simply an implementation of the standard Tabular Islamic calendar algorithm used in Islamic astronomical tables since the 11th century.

8-year cycle 
Tabular Islamic calendars based on an 8-year cycle (with 2, 5 and 8 as leap years) were also used in the Ottoman Empire and in South-East Asia. The cycle contains 96 months in 2835 days, giving a mean month length of 29.53125 days, or 29d 12h 45m.

Though less accurate than the tabular calendars based on a 30-year cycle, it was popular due to the fact that in each cycle the weekdays fall on the same calendar date. In other words, the 8-year cycle is exactly 405 weeks long, resulting in a mean of exactly 4.21875 weeks per month.

120-year cycle 
In the Dutch East Indies (now Indonesia) into the early 20th century, the 8-year cycle was reset every 120 years by omitting the intercalary day at the end of the last year, thus resulting in a mean month length equal with that used in the 30-year cycles.

See also
 Hijri year
 Crescent Islamic calendar

References

Literature

 Marcus Gossler, "Basisformeln zur programmierten Umrechnung einiger astronomischer Kalendertypen", Astronomische Nachrichten, 301 (1980), 191–194 online link.
 D.A. Hatcher, "Generalized Equations for Julian Day Numbers and Calendar Dates", Quarterly Journal of the Royal Astronomical Society, 26 (1985), 151–155 online link.
 Denis Savoie, "Calcul des concordances entre calendrier musulman et calendrier grégorien ou julien", Observations et Travaux (Société astronomique de France), 26 (1991), 12–19 online link.
LeRoy E. Doggett, "Calendars", in: P. Kenneth Seidelmann (ed.), Explanatory Supplement to the Astronomical Almanac: A Revision to the Explanatory Supplement to the Astronomical Ephemeris and the American Ephemeris and Nautical Almanac (Mill Valley [CA]: University Science Books, 1992), pp. 575–608 (cf. sections 12.4 & 12.93 for the Islamic calendar) online link.
 Jean Meeus, "Jewish and Moslem Calendars", in: Astronomical Algorithms: Second Edition (Richmond: Willmann-Bell, 1998), chapter 9.
 Edward G. Richards, "Calendars", in: S.E. Urban & P. Kenneth Seidelmann (eds.), Explanatory Supplement to the Astronomical Almanac: Third Edition (Mill Valley [CA]: University Science Books, 2013), pp. 585–624 (cf. sections 15.6 & 15.11 for the Islamic calendar).
 Edward M. Reingold & Nachum Dershowitz, Calendrical Calculations: The Ultimate Edition (Cambridge: Cambridge University Press, 2018), chapters 7 & 18.3.

External links
 Islamic-Western Calendar Converter (Based on the Arithmetical or Tabular Calendar) – includes four known variants
 Online Alavi Taiyebi Calendar
 Calendar Converter

Islamic calendar
Dawoodi Bohras
Islamic terminology

ar:تقويم هجري#التقويم الهجري المجدول